Stephan Paßlack (born 24 August 1970) is a German former professional footballer who played as a right-back. At international level, he represented Germany playing for the U21 team, the B team and the first team with whom he earned four caps scoring one goal.

Career
Born in Moers, West Germany, Paßlack began his career as a youth player at local football club TV Asberg before eventually moving on to VfB Homberg where he played until 1986. He then went on to play for many more German clubs including 1. FC Köln, Eintracht Frankfurt and KFC Uerdingen 05 before gaining his first international cap in 1996 against Armenia while he was playing for Borussia Mönchengladbach. After staying with Mönchengladbach for three years, he left to play for 1860 Munich and then to 1. FC Nürnberg before finally ending his career in 2006 back with his old club KFC Uerdingen.

Honours
 2. Bundesliga North (II): 1991–92
 2. Bundesliga (II): 2003–04

References

External links
 
 
 

Living people
1970 births
German footballers
Germany international footballers
Germany B international footballers
Germany under-21 international footballers
Bundesliga players
2. Bundesliga players
Association football fullbacks
1. FC Köln players
Eintracht Frankfurt players
Borussia Mönchengladbach players
1. FC Nürnberg players
TSV 1860 Munich players
KFC Uerdingen 05 players
VfB Homberg players
People from Moers
Sportspeople from Düsseldorf (region)
Footballers from North Rhine-Westphalia